The subgenus Dorsilopha belongs to genus Drosophila and consists of four species. The phylogenetic position of this group has been unclear for a long time, but recent studies have shown that the subgenus is positioned ancestral to the subgenus Drosophila.

Species 
Drosophila busckii Coquillett, 1901
Drosophila confertidentata Zhang, Li and Feng, 2006
Drosophila linearidentata Toda, 1986
Drosophila neobusckii Toda, 1986

References 

 D
Insect subgenera